Ros Hill, also known as Ros Castle due to the 3,000-year-old Iron Age hill fort on its summit, is a hill in the county of Northumberland in northern England. It is the highest point of a low range of hills stretching from Alnwick to Berwick-upon-Tweed — the Chillingham Hills. Other tops of the Chillingham Hills include Titlington Pike, Dod Law and Doddington Northmoor. However, Ros Hill is significantly higher than these and towers over the surrounding landscape with easily enough relative height to make it a "Marilyn".

Ros Hill is situated just above Chillingham, with its famous herd of Chillingham cattle. Due to the wide enclosure of the cattle there are no paths on the western slopes, and the eastern slopes are featureless moor, so the best ascent option is to park at the summit of the minor road that crosses Hepburn Moor just to the south of the summit, giving a walk just over half a mile long and taking about half an hour.

The summit is marked by a triangulation station and nearby there is a rather unusual walk-in toposcope built into the wall with four separate plaques. The view is panoramic and very extensive, and on a clear day, a total of seven castles can be seen from the summit, including the one on Holy Island. There is also a view over the cattle park to the north, while purple heather covers most of the surrounding area.

Etymology
Ros Hill preserves the Brittonic element "rhos", "moor, promontory".

References

External links
Ros Castle Pictures and historical notes for Ros Castle.

Marilyns of England
Hills of Northumberland
Mountains and hills of the United Kingdom with toposcopes